Viscount is a type of European nobility.

Viscount may also refer to:

 Viscount (musical instrument manufacturer), an Italian company
 Vickers Viscount, a turboprop airliner
 Viscount (biscuit)
 Rural Municipality of Viscount No. 341, Saskatchewan, Canada
 Viscount, Saskatchewan, a village within the rural municipality
 Viscount Island, on the Central Coast of British Columbia
 , a British destroyer in commission in the Royal Navy from 1918 to 1945
 Viscount (cigarette brand)
 Dodge Viscount, an automobile produced in 1959 by Chrysler of Canada

See also 

 The Viscounts (disambiguation)
 Viscountcy of Béarn